Nancy Rawles is an American playwright, novelist, and teacher. She is a 2006 recipient of the Alex Awards.

Life
Rawles grew up in Los Angeles. She graduated from Northwestern University with a degree in Journalism. 
Rawles studied play writing in Chicago with Linda Walsh Jenkins and Steven Carter. She later studied with C. Bernard Jackson of the Los Angeles (Inner City) Cultural Center and Valerie Curtis Newton of The Hansberry Project. She is a contributor to the Female Sexual Ethics Project at Brandeis University under the direction of Bernadette Brooten, Kraft-Hiatt Professor of Christian Studies.

Awards

2009 – Seattle Reads My Jim
2007 – Artist Trust Fellowship in Fiction
2006 – American Library Association Alex Award
2006 – Hurston/Wright Foundation Legacy Award in Fiction
2000 – Astraea Foundation, Claire of the Moon Award for Fiction
1998 – American Book Award, Before Columbus Foundation
1998 – Washington State Governor's Writers Award

Works

Novels

Criticism

References

External links
"Nancy Rawles Revisits a Twain Character for 'My Jim'", NPR, Alan Cheuse, February 22, 2005 

"The Importance of Place: Lisa Albers talks with prominent local authors about their writing", Seattle Woman

Writers from Los Angeles
20th-century American novelists
21st-century American novelists
American women novelists
City University of Seattle alumni
20th-century American women writers
21st-century American women writers
Living people
American Book Award winners
Year of birth missing (living people)